Sphingomonas morindae  is a Gram-negative, aerobic, short rod-shaped, non-spore-forming and non-motile bacteria from the genus of Sphingomonas which has been isolated from the inner tissue of the plant Morinda citrifolia in Sanya on Hainan in China.

References

Further reading

External links
Type strain of Sphingomonas morindae at BacDive -  the Bacterial Diversity Metadatabase

morindae
Bacteria described in 2015